Der Heiland auf dem Eiland is a German television series.

See also
List of German television series

External links
 

2004 German television series debuts
2005 German television series endings
German comedy television series
Television shows set on islands
German-language television shows
RTL (German TV channel) original programming